Filippo Penna (born 24 March 1995) is an Italian footballer who plays as a central defender for Santarcangelo.

On 8 July 2015 he was signed by Lanciano along with Marco Di Benedetto, as part of the deal that Mame Baba Thiam moved to Juventus outright in June.

References

External links

1995 births
Living people
Association football defenders
Italian footballers
Juventus F.C. players
FC Den Bosch players
S.S. Virtus Lanciano 1924 players